is a current professional basketball Head coach for Ehime Orange Vikings of the Japanese B.League.

Career statistics

|-
| align="left" | 2005-06
| align="left" | Saitama
| 17 || 14 || 27.9 || .327 || .319 || .814 || 3.9 || 1.6 || 1.0 || 0.0 ||  9.6
|-
| align="left" | 2006-07
| align="left" | Saitama
| 35 || 33 || 27.1 || .415 || bgcolor="CFECEC"|.444* || .709 || 1.8 || 1.9 || 0.7 || 0.1 || 9.9
|-
| align="left" |  2007-08
| align="left" | Saitama
| 44 || 38 || 25.5 || .377 || .379 || .816 || 2.1 || 2.1 || 0.3 || 0.1 ||  7.8
|-
| align="left" | 2008-09
| align="left" | Saitama
| 52 || 28 || 18.9 || .428 || .408 || .747 || 1.5 || 1.2 || 0.3 || 0.1 ||  5.9
|-
| align="left" |  2009-10
| align="left" | Takamatsu
| 50 || 20 || 17.7 || .324 || .277 || .806 || 1.7 || 0.4 || 0.4 || 0.1 ||  4.0
|-
| align="left" |  2010-11
| align="left" | Akita
| 48 || 37 || 23.0 || .339 || .339 || .732 || 2.4 || 1.6 || 0.5 || 0.1 ||  6.0
|-
| align="left" |  2011-12
| align="left" | Akita
| 52 || 52 || 31.3 || .413 || .383 || .730 || 3.1 || 1.3 || 1.1 || 0.1 ||  7.5
|-
| align="left" | 2012-13
| align="left" | Akita
| 48 ||  || 22.0 || .417 || .433 || .872 || 2.0 || 1.0 || 0.6 || 0.1 ||  4.8
|-

Head coaching record

|- 
| style="text-align:left;"|Niigata Albirex BB
| style="text-align:left;"|2016-17
| 60||27||33|||| style="text-align:center;"|4th in Central|||-||-||-||
| style="text-align:center;"|
|-
| style="text-align:left;"|Niigata Albirex BB
| style="text-align:left;"|2017-18
| 60||28||32|||| style="text-align:center;"|3rd in Central|||-||-||-||
| style="text-align:center;"|
|-
| style="text-align:left;"|Niigata Albirex BB
| style="text-align:left;"|2018-19
| 60||45||15|||| style="text-align:center;"|1st in Central|||2||0||2||
| style="text-align:center;"|Lost in 1st round
|-
| style="text-align:left;"|Niigata Albirex BB
| style="text-align:left;"|2019-20
| 41||13||28|||| style="text-align:center;"|4th in Central|||-||-||-||
| style="text-align:center;"|-
|-

External links
Akita's Shoji video
USA vs Japan 2000

References

1974 births
Living people
Akita Northern Happinets players
Alvark Tokyo players
Japanese basketball coaches
Kagawa Five Arrows players
Niigata Albirex BB coaches
Niigata Albirex BB players
Rizing Zephyr Fukuoka players
Saitama Broncos players
Sportspeople from Saitama Prefecture